František Svoboda (5 August 1906 – 6 July 1948) was a Czech football player who played as a striker. His nickname was "Franci" (the French).

Club career
He started his career with Vinohrady Rapid, from where he moved to Slavia Prague in 1926, and with them he was the Champions of Czechoslovakia 8 times, played a pivotal role in helping the club to win 8 national league titles, scoring 101 league goals in his 14 years at the club and being the top goalscorer of the 1934–35 season with 27 goals. He remained in Slavia until 1940, after which he succeeded Viktoria Zizkov.

Svoboda enjoyed great fame in his playing days, being a respected and feared striker throughout Europe. Svoboda was a very strong and muscular player, but despite being robust in stature, his movement was elegant and he excelled especially at rocket shots even from great distances, becoming known for his goals from long range.

International career
He played 43 matches in 10 years for the Czechoslovakia national team, scoring 22 goals, and he was a member of the team that reached the final of the 1934 FIFA World Cup, playing in three matches and scoring a goal in the match against Switzerland. Half of his international tally came in the Central European Cup, and with those 11 goals, he is the fourth all-time top goal scorer in the competition's history.

International goals
Czechoslovakia score listed first, score column indicates score after each Svoboda goal.

Honours

Club
Slavia Prague

Czechoslovak First League:
Champions (8): 1928–29, 1929–30, 1930–31, 1932–33, 1933–34, 1934–35, 1936–37 and 1939–40

International
Czechoslovakia

World Cup:
Runners-up (1): 1934

Central European Cup:
Runners-up (1): 1927–30

Individual
Top goalscorer of the 1934–35 Czechoslovak First League with 27 goals

References 

1906 births
1948 deaths
Czech footballers
Czechoslovak footballers
1934 FIFA World Cup players
SK Slavia Prague players
Czechoslovakia international footballers
Footballers from Vienna
Association football forwards